South Jakarta, colloquially known as Jaksel, is one of the five administrative cities which form the Special Capital Region of Jakarta, Indonesia. South Jakarta is not self-governed and does not have a city council, hence it is not classified as a proper municipality. It had a population of 2,062,232 at the 2010 census and 2,226,812 at the 2020 census, and it is the third most populous among the five administrative cities of Jakarta, after East Jakarta and West Jakarta. The administrative centre is at Kebayoran Baru.

South Jakarta is bounded by Central Jakarta to the north, East Jakarta to the east, Depok city to the south, West Jakarta to the northwest, and by Tangerang and South Tangerang cities to the west.

Districts 
South Jakarta is subdivided into ten districts (kecamatan), listed below with their areas and their populations at the 2010 census and according to the mid-2019 official estimates:

Economy 

In the days following World War II, South Jakarta was planned to be a satellite city (especially the Kebayoran Baru area) and by using the oriental concept. This area also contains some industrial centers for different types of commodities. South Jakarta is a prosperous administrative city compared to the others, with much middle-to-upper class housing and major business centres. South Jakarta has the highest Human Development Index of all Jakarta's administrative cities, with an HDI of 0.833.

Much of the central business district is concentrated in Setiabudi, South Jakarta, such as Sudirman Central Business District (SCBD) in Senayan, Kebayoran Baru. Initially, SCBD was a service provider and real estate investment, but nowadays, it is becoming the most integrated mixed-use area in Indonesia.

See also

Jakarta
Central Jakarta
East Jakarta
West Jakarta
North Jakarta
Thousand Islands (Indonesia)

References

External links

 South Jakarta official website